Dorset/Kawagama Lake (Old Mill Marina) Water Aerodrome  was located  northeast of Dorset, Ontario Canada.

References

Defunct seaplane bases in Ontario